Mika Hokajärvi (born 6 February 1987 in Tampere) is a Finnish sprint canoer who competed in the late 2000s. At the 2008 Summer Olympics in Beijing, he was eliminated in the semifinals of both the K-2 500 m and the K-2 1000 m events. Mika's manager is Finnish Sport Management Agency, SportElite.

References
 Mika's profile at SportElite's website
 Sports-Reference.com profile

1987 births
Living people
Canoeists from Tampere
Canoeists at the 2008 Summer Olympics
Finnish male canoeists
Olympic canoeists of Finland